Avsa is a small village in the Municipality of Kobarid in the Littoral region of Slovenia, close to the border with Italy.

References

External links 
Avsa on Geopedia

Populated places in the Municipality of Kobarid